Łabusz  is a part of the city of Koszalin. Until 31 December 2009 it was a village in the administrative district of Gmina Będzino, within Koszalin County, West Pomeranian Voivodeship, in north-western Poland.

For the history of the region, see History of Pomerania.

References

Koszalin
Neighbourhoods in Poland